Danielle Proulx (born October 12, 1952 in Montreal, Quebec) is a French Canadian actress. She is a two-time Genie Award winner for Best Supporting Actress, for her roles in Love Crazy (Amoureux fou) in 1991 and C.R.A.Z.Y. in 2005.

In 2019, she played the regular role of Grand-Mère in a revival of the influential children's series Passe-Partout.

She was married to Raymond Cloutier. Her son, Émile Proulx-Cloutier, is also an actor, as is her niece, Catherine Proulx-Lemay.

References

External links
 

1952 births
Canadian film actresses
Canadian television actresses
French Quebecers
Best Supporting Actress Genie and Canadian Screen Award winners
Living people
Actresses from Montreal
Best Supporting Actress Jutra and Iris Award winners